Penda's Way railway station was a railway station on the Cross Gates–Wetherby line at the eastern edge of Cross Gates in West Yorkshire.  The station opened on 5 June 1939 to serve a new housing estate and was named after a nearby battle where King Penda was killed. It closed on 6 January 1964 together with the line and has been demolished entirely.

The station was intended to serve the increasing commuter traffic in the area. A lattice footbridge connected the northern ends of the platforms. The station was staffed and handled parcels as well as baskets of homing pigeons, but it had no freight facilities.

Lines

References

Disused railway stations in Leeds
Beeching closures in England
Former London and North Eastern Railway stations
Railway stations in Great Britain opened in 1939
Railway stations in Great Britain closed in 1964